Comarca de Guadix is a comarca in the province of Granada, Spain. It is also called: "Accitania". It contains the following municipalities:

 Albuñán
 Aldeire
 Alquife
 Beas de Guadix
 Benalúa
 La Calahorra
 Cogollos de Guadix
 Cortes y Graena
 Darro
 Diezma
 Dólar
 Ferreira
 Fonelas
 Gor
 Gorafe
 Guadix
 Huélago
 Huéneja
 Jérez del Marquesado
 Lanteira
 Lugros
 Marchal
 La Peza
 Polícar
 Purullena
 Valle del Zalabí

References 

Comarcas of the Province of Granada